Noumena is a Finnish melodic death metal band. The band's name comes from the word noumenon, a philosophical term used by Immanuel Kant. The band consists of five members: vocalist Antti Haapanen, guitarists Tuukka Tuomela and Ville Lamminaho, bass guitarist Hannu Savolainen and drummer Ilkka Unnbom, a lineup they have maintained since their formation. Session member is female vocalist Suvi Uura. Hanna Leinonen and Tuomas Tuominen appear as guest vocalists on Absence and Anatomy of Life.

History
Noumena was founded in Ähtäri, Finland in the spring of 1998. In 1999, after two demo tapes and several concerts, the band was given a record deal with a Singaporean record label. Their debut album was recorded later that year at Astia Studio; however, the record label went bankrupt before the album was released. It was not until late 2001 that an Australian label, Catharsis Records, agreed to release the album, given the title Pride/Fall.

The following years were unproductive, until, in January 2004, Noumena released a four-track promo. This was moderately successful and led to a deal with Spikefarm Records. The band spent the next October and November making their second album, Absence, which was released April 13, 2005. On November 1, 2006 they released Anatomy of Life through Spikefarm Records. The album received praise from Metal Maniacs for being, "...another confident step in turning Noumena into Finland’s biggest new export.” Earlier the same year they released the EP "Triumph and Loss" which was only made available online. Currently they have created their own label (Haunted Zoo Production) under which they have launched their last three albums, Death Walks With Me, Myrrys and Anima.

Music
The roots of Noumena's music may be found in the Scandinavian death metal tradition and 1980s heavy metal. Their lyrics often deal with loss, sadness, and darkness. The band has stated on their official page that they try to keep their music "Fresh, Experimental, and Versatile."

Discography

Albums
 Pride/Fall (2002)
 Absence (2005)
 Anatomy of Life (2006)
 Death Walks With Me (2013)
 Myrrys (2017)
 Anima (2020)

EPs
 Triumph and Loss (2006) (digital release only)

Demos and promos
 Aeons (1998)
 For the Fragile One (1999)
 Promo 2000
 Sala
 The Tempter (2004)
 Sleep (2009)

References

External links
 Noumena's official homepage
 

Finnish melodic death metal musical groups
Musical groups established in 1998
Musical quintets